In philosophy, naturalism is the idea or belief that only natural laws and forces (as opposed to supernatural ones) operate in the universe.

According to philosopher Steven Lockwood, naturalism can be separated into an ontological sense and a methodological sense.  "Ontological" refers to ontology, the philosophical study of what exists. On an ontological level, philosophers often treat naturalism as equivalent to materialism. For example, philosopher Paul Kurtz argues that nature is best accounted for by reference to material principles. These principles include mass, energy, and other physical and chemical properties accepted by the scientific community. Further, this sense of naturalism holds that spirits, deities, and ghosts are not real and that there is no "purpose" in nature. This stronger formulation of naturalism is commonly referred to as metaphysical naturalism. On the other hand, the more moderate view that naturalism should be assumed in one's working methods as the current paradigm, without any further consideration of whether naturalism is true in the robust metaphysical sense, is called methodological naturalism.

With the exception of pantheists – who believe that Nature is identical with divinity while not recognizing a distinct personal anthropomorphic god – theists challenge the idea that nature contains all of reality. According to some theists, natural laws may be viewed as secondary causes of God(s).

In the 20th century, Willard Van Orman Quine, George Santayana, and other philosophers argued that the success of naturalism in science meant that scientific methods should also be used in philosophy. According to this view, science and philosophy are not always distinct from one another, but instead form a continuum.

History of naturalism

Ancient and medieval philosophy
Naturalism is most notably a Western phenomenon, but an equivalent idea has long existed in the East. Naturalism was the foundation of two out of six orthodox schools and one heterodox school of Hinduism. Samkhya, one of the oldest schools of Indian philosophy puts nature (Prakriti) as the primary cause of the universe, without assuming the existence of a personal God or Ishwara.  The Carvaka, Nyaya, Vaisheshika schools originated in the 7th, 6th, and 2nd century BCE, respectively. Similarly, though unnamed and never articulated into a coherent system, one tradition within Confucian philosophy embraced a form of Naturalism dating to the Wang Chong in the 1st century, if not earlier, but it arose independently and had little influence on the development of modern naturalist philosophy or on Eastern or Western culture. 

Western metaphysical naturalism originated in ancient Greek philosophy. The earliest pre-Socratic philosophers, especially the Milesians (Thales, Anaximander, and Anaximenes) and the atomists (Leucippus and Democritus), were labeled by their peers and successors "the physikoi" (from the Greek φυσικός or physikos, meaning "natural philosopher" borrowing on the word φύσις or physis, meaning "nature") because they investigated natural causes, often excluding any role for gods in the creation or operation of the world. This eventually led to fully developed systems such as Epicureanism, which sought to explain everything that exists as the product of atoms falling and swerving in a void. 

Aristotle surveyed the thought of his predecessors and conceived of nature in a way that charted a middle course between their excesses.

With the rise and dominance of Christianity in the West and the later spread of Islam, metaphysical naturalism was generally abandoned by intellectuals. Thus, there is little evidence for it in medieval philosophy. The reintroduction of Aristotle's empirical epistemology as well as previously lost treatises by Greco-Roman natural philosophers which was begun by the medieval Scholastics without resulting in any noticeable increase in commitment to naturalism.

Modern philosophy
It was not until the early modern era of philosophy and the Age of Enlightenment that naturalists like Benedict Spinoza (who put forward a theory of psychophysical parallelism), David Hume and the proponents of French materialism (notably Denis Diderot, Julien La Mettrie, and Baron d'Holbach) started to emerge again in the 17th and 18th centuries. In this period, some metaphysical naturalists adhered to a distinct doctrine, materialism, which became the dominant category of metaphysical naturalism widely defended until the end of the 19th century.

Immanuel Kant rejected (reductionist) materialist positions in metaphysics, but he was not hostile to naturalism. His transcendental philosophy is considered to be a form of liberal naturalism.

In late modern philosophy, Naturphilosophie, a form of natural philosophy, was developed by Friedrich Wilhelm Joseph von Schelling and Georg Wilhelm Friedrich Hegel as an attempt to comprehend nature in its totality and to outline its general theoretical structure.

A version of naturalism that arose after Hegel was Ludwig Feuerbach's anthropological materialism, which influenced Karl Marx and Friedrich Engels's historical materialism, Engels's "materialist dialectic" philosophy of nature (Dialectics of Nature), and their follower Georgi Plekhanov's dialectical materialism.

Another notable school of late modern philosophy advocating naturalism was German materialism: members included Ludwig Büchner, Jacob Moleschott, and Carl Vogt.

The current usage of the term naturalism "derives from debates in America in the first half of the 20th century. The self-proclaimed 'naturalists' from that period included John Dewey, Ernest Nagel, Sidney Hook and Roy Wood Sellars."

Contemporary philosophy
A politicized version of naturalism that has arisen in contemporary philosophy is Ayn Rand's Objectivism. Objectivism is an expression of capitalist ethical idealism within a naturalistic framework. An example of a more progressive naturalistic philosophy is secular humanism.

The current usage of the term naturalism "derives from debates in America in the first half of the last century.

Currently, metaphysical naturalism is more widely embraced than in previous centuries, especially but not exclusively in the natural sciences and the Anglo-American, analytic philosophical communities. While the vast majority of the population of the world remains firmly committed to non-naturalistic worldviews, contemporary defenders of naturalism and/or naturalistic theses and doctrines today include Kai Nielsen, J. J. C. Smart, David Malet Armstrong, David Papineau, Paul Kurtz, Brian Leiter, Daniel Dennett, Michael Devitt, Fred Dretske, Paul and Patricia Churchland, Mario Bunge, Jonathan Schaffer, Hilary Kornblith, Leonard Olson, Quentin Smith, Paul Draper and Michael Martin, among many other academic philosophers.

According to David Papineau, contemporary naturalism is a consequence of the build-up of scientific evidence during the twentieth century for the "causal closure of the physical", the doctrine that all physical effects can be accounted for by physical causes.

In contemporary continental philosophy, Quentin Meillassoux proposed speculative materialism, a post-Kantian return to David Hume which can strengthen classical materialist ideas.

Etymology 
The term "methodological naturalism" is much more recent, though. According to Ronald Numbers, it was coined in 1983 by Paul de Vries, a Wheaton College philosopher. De Vries distinguished between what he called "methodological naturalism", a disciplinary method that says nothing about God's existence, and "metaphysical naturalism", which "denies the existence of a transcendent God". The term "methodological naturalism" had been used in 1937 by Edgar S. Brightman in an article in The Philosophical Review as a contrast to "naturalism" in general, but there the idea was not really developed to its more recent distinctions.

Description

According to Steven Schafersman, naturalism is a philosophy that maintains that;
 "Nature encompasses all that exists throughout space and time; 
 Nature (the universe or cosmos) consists only of natural elements, that is, of spatio-temporal physical substance – mass –energy. Non-physical or quasi-physical substance, such as information, ideas, values, logic, mathematics, intellect, and other emergent phenomena, either supervene upon the physical or can be reduced to a physical account;
 Nature operates by the laws of physics and in principle, can be explained and understood by science and philosophy;
 The supernatural does not exist, i.e., only nature is real. Naturalism is therefore a metaphysical philosophy opposed primarily by supernaturalism".

Or, as Carl Sagan succinctly put it: "The Cosmos is all that is or ever was or ever will be."

In addition Arthur C. Danto states that Naturalism, in recent usage, is a species of philosophical monism according to which whatever exists or happens is natural in the sense of being susceptible to explanation through methods which, although paradigmatically exemplified in the natural sciences, are continuous from domain to domain of objects and events. Hence, naturalism is polemically defined as repudiating the view that there exists or could exist any entities which lie, in principle, beyond the scope of scientific explanation.

Arthur Newell Strahler states: "The naturalistic view is that the particular universe we observe came into existence and has operated through all time and in all its parts without the impetus or guidance of any supernatural agency." "The great majority of contemporary philosophers urge that that reality is exhausted by nature, containing nothing ‘supernatural’, and that the scientific method should be used to investigate all areas of reality, including the ‘human spirit’.” Philosophers widely regard naturalism as a "positive" term, and "few active philosophers nowadays are happy to announce themselves as 'non-naturalists'". "Philosophers concerned with religion tend to be less enthusiastic about 'naturalism'" and that despite an "inevitable" divergence due to its popularity, if more narrowly construed, (to the chagrin of John McDowell, David Chalmers and Jennifer Hornsby, for example), those not so disqualified remain nonetheless content "to set the bar for 'naturalism' higher."

Alvin Plantinga stated that Naturalism is presumed to not be a religion. However, in one very important respect it resembles religion by performing the cognitive function of a religion. There is a set of deep human questions to which a religion typically provides an answer. In like manner  naturalism gives a set of answers to these questions".

Providing assumptions required for science
According to Robert Priddy, all scientific study inescapably builds on at least some essential assumptions that cannot be tested by scientific processes;  that is, that scientists must start with some assumptions as to the ultimate analysis of the facts with which it deals. These assumptions would then be justified partly by their adherence to the types of occurrence of which we are directly conscious, and partly by their success in representing the observed facts with a certain generality, devoid of ad hoc suppositions." Kuhn also claims that all science is based on an approved agenda of unprovable assumptions about the character of the universe, rather than merely on empirical facts. These assumptions – a paradigm – comprise a collection of beliefs, values and techniques that are held by a given scientific community, which legitimize their systems and set the limitations to their investigation. For naturalists, nature is the only reality, the "correct" paradigm, and there is no such thing as supernatural, i.e. anything above, beyond, or outside of nature.  The scientific method is to be used to investigate all reality, including the human spirit.

Some claim that naturalism is the implicit philosophy of working scientists, and that the following basic assumptions are needed to justify the scientific method:

That there is an objective reality shared by all rational observers."The basis for rationality is acceptance of an external objective reality." "Objective reality is clearly an essential thing if we are to develop a meaningful perspective of the world. Nevertheless its very existence is assumed."  "Our belief that objective reality exist is an assumption that it arises from a real world outside of ourselves. As infants we made this assumption unconsciously.  People are happy to make this assumption that adds meaning to our sensations and feelings, than live with solipsism." "Without this assumption, there would be only the thoughts and images in our own mind (which would be the only existing mind) and there would be no need of science, or anything else."
That this objective reality is governed by natural laws; "Science, at least today, assumes that the universe obeys knowable principles that don't depend on time or place, nor on subjective parameters such as what we think, know or how we behave."  Hugh Gauch argues that science presupposes that "the physical world is orderly and comprehensible."
That reality can be discovered by means of systematic observation and experimentation.Stanley Sobottka said: "The assumption of external reality is necessary for science to function and to flourish. For the most part, science is the discovering and explaining of the external world." "Science attempts to produce knowledge that is as universal and objective as possible within the realm of human understanding."
 That Nature has uniformity of laws and most if not all things in nature must have at least a natural cause.Biologist Stephen Jay Gould referred to these two closely related propositions as the constancy of nature's laws and the operation of known processes.  Simpson agrees that the axiom of uniformity of law, an unprovable postulate, is necessary in order for scientists to extrapolate inductive inference into the unobservable past in order to meaningfully study it. "The assumption of spatial and temporal invariance of natural laws is by no means unique to geology since it amounts to a warrant for inductive inference which, as Bacon showed nearly four hundred years ago, is the basic mode of reasoning in empirical science. Without assuming this spatial and temporal invariance, we have no basis for extrapolating from the known to the unknown and, therefore, no way of reaching general conclusions from a finite number of observations. (Since the assumption is itself vindicated by induction, it can in no way "prove" the validity of induction — an endeavor virtually abandoned after Hume demonstrated its futility two centuries ago)." Gould also notes that natural processes such as Lyell's "uniformity of process" are an assumption: "As such, it is another a priori assumption shared by all scientists and not a statement about the empirical world." According to R. Hooykaas: "The principle of uniformity is not a law, not a rule established after comparison of facts, but a principle, preceding the observation of facts ... It is the logical principle of parsimony of causes and of economy of scientific notions. By explaining past changes by analogy with present phenomena, a limit is set to conjecture, for there is only one way in which two things are equal, but there are an infinity of ways in which they could be supposed different."
 That experimental procedures will be done satisfactorily without any deliberate or unintentional mistakes that will influence the results. 
 That experimenters won't be significantly biased by their presumptions.
 That random sampling is representative of the entire population.A simple random sample (SRS) is the most basic probabilistic option used for creating a sample from a population. The benefit of SRS is that the investigator is guaranteed to choose a sample that represents the population that ensures statistically valid conclusions.

Metaphysical naturalism 

Naturalism in its primary sense is known as metaphysical naturalism, ontological naturalism, pure naturalism, philosophical naturalism and antisupernaturalism. Metaphysical naturalism rejects the supernatural concepts and explanations that are part of many religions.

Methodological naturalism 

Methodological naturalism, this second sense of the term "naturalism", seeks to provide a framework of acquiring knowledge that requires scientists to seek explanations of how the world around us functions based on what we can observe, test, replicate and verify. It is a distinct system of thought concerned with a cognitive approach to reality, and is thus a philosophy of knowledge. It is a self-imposed convention of science that attempts to explain and test scientific endeavors, hypotheses, and events with reference to natural causes and events.  

Steven Schafersman states that methodological naturalism is "the adoption or assumption of philosophical naturalism within the scientific method with or without fully accepting or believing it ... science is not metaphysical and does not depend on the ultimate truth of any metaphysics for its success, but methodological naturalism must be adopted as a strategy or working hypothesis for science to succeed. We may therefore be agnostic about the ultimate truth of naturalism, but must nevertheless adopt it and investigate nature as if nature is all that there is."

Studies by sociologist Elaine Ecklund suggest that religious scientists in practice apply methodological naturalism. They report that their religious beliefs affect the way they think about the implications – often moral – of their work, but not the way they practice science.

In a series of articles and books from 1996 onward, Robert T. Pennock wrote using the term "methodological naturalism" to clarify that the scientific method confines itself to natural explanations without assuming the existence or non-existence of the supernatural, and is not based on dogmatic metaphysical naturalism. Pennock's testimony as an expert witness at the Kitzmiller v. Dover Area School District trial was cited by the Judge in his Memorandum Opinion concluding that "Methodological naturalism is a 'ground rule' of science today":

Eugenie Scott stated:

She suggests that scientists can defuse some of the opposition to evolution by first recognizing that the vast majority of Americans are believers, and that most Americans want to retain their faith. She believes that individuals can retain religious beliefs and still accept evolution through methodological naturalism. Scientists should therefore avoid mentioning metaphysical naturalism and use methodological naturalism instead.

Schafersman writes that "while science as a process only requires methodological naturalism, I think that the assumption of methodological naturalism by scientists and others logically and morally entails ontological naturalism", and "I maintain that the practice or adoption of methodological naturalism entails a logical and moral belief in ontological naturalism, so they are not logically decoupled." Strahler agrees: "The naturalistic [ontological] view is that the particular universe we observe came into existence and has operated through all time and in all its parts without the impetus or guidance of any supernatural agency. The naturalistic view is espoused by science as its fundamental assumption."

Views on methodological naturalism

W. V. O. Quine 

W. V. O. Quine describes naturalism as the position that there is no higher tribunal for truth than natural science itself. In his view, there is no better method than the scientific method for judging the claims of science, and there is neither any need nor any place for a "first philosophy", such as (abstract) metaphysics or epistemology, that could stand behind and justify science or the scientific method.

Therefore, philosophy should feel free to make use of the findings of scientists in its own pursuit, while also feeling free to offer criticism when those claims are ungrounded, confused, or inconsistent. In Quine's view, philosophy is "continuous with" science, and both are empirical. Naturalism is not a dogmatic belief that the modern view of science is entirely correct. Instead, it simply holds that science is the best way to explore the processes of the universe and that those processes are what modern science is striving to understand.

Karl Popper 
Karl Popper equated naturalism with inductive theory of science. He rejected it based on his general critique of induction (see problem of induction), yet acknowledged its utility as means for inventing conjectures.

Popper instead proposed that science should adopt a methodology based on falsifiability for demarcation, because no number of experiments can ever prove a theory, but a single experiment can contradict one. Popper holds that scientific theories are characterized by falsifiability.

Alvin Plantinga 
Alvin Plantinga, Professor Emeritus of Philosophy at Notre Dame, and a Christian, has become a well-known critic of naturalism.  He suggests, in his evolutionary argument against naturalism, that the probability that evolution has produced humans with reliable true beliefs, is low or inscrutable, unless the evolution of humans was guided (for example, by God). According to David Kahan of the University of Glasgow, in order to understand how beliefs are warranted, a justification must be found in the context of supernatural theism, as in Plantinga's epistemology. (See also supernormal stimuli).

Plantinga argues that together, naturalism and evolution provide an insurmountable "defeater for the belief that our cognitive faculties are reliable", i.e., a skeptical argument along the lines of Descartes' evil demon or brain in a vat.

The argument is controversial and has been criticized as seriously flawed, for example, by Elliott Sober.

Robert T. Pennock 
Robert T. Pennock states that as supernatural agents and powers "are above and beyond the natural world and its agents and powers" and "are not constrained by natural laws", only logical impossibilities constrain what a supernatural agent cannot do. He says: "If we could apply natural knowledge to understand supernatural powers, then, by definition, they would not be supernatural." As the supernatural is necessarily a mystery to us, it can provide no grounds on which one can judge scientific models. "Experimentation requires observation and control of the variables.... But by definition we have no control over supernatural entities or forces." Science does not deal with meanings; the closed system of scientific reasoning cannot be used to define itself. Allowing science to appeal to untestable supernatural powers would make the scientist's task meaningless, undermine the discipline that allows science to make progress, and "would be as profoundly unsatisfying as the ancient Greek playwright's reliance upon the deus ex machina to extract his hero from a difficult predicament."

Naturalism of this sort says nothing about the existence or nonexistence of the supernatural, which by this definition is beyond natural testing. As a practical consideration, the rejection of supernatural explanations would merely be pragmatic, thus it would nonetheless be possible for an ontological supernaturalist to espouse and practice methodological naturalism. For example, scientists may believe in God while practicing methodological naturalism in their scientific work. This position does not preclude knowledge that is somehow connected to the supernatural. Generally however, anything that one can examine and explain scientifically would not be supernatural, simply by definition.

Criticism

Applicability of mathematics to the material universe 
The late philosopher of mathematics Mark Steiner has written extensively on this matter and acknowledges that the applicability of mathematics constitutes "a challenge to the entrenched dogma of naturalism."

See also 

 Atheism
 Clockwork universe
 Daoism
 Deism
 Dysteleology
 Empiricism
 Hylomorphism
 LaVeyan Satanism
 Legal naturalism
 Liberal naturalism
 Materialism
 Naturalist computationalism
 Naturalistic fallacy
 Naturalistic pantheism
 Philosophy of nature
 Physicalism
 Platonized naturalism
 Poetic naturalism
 Religious naturalism
 Scientism
 Sociological naturalism
 Supernaturalism
 Transcendental naturalism
 Vaisheshika

References

Citations

References

Further reading 
 Mario De Caro and David Macarthur (eds) Naturalism in Question. Cambridge, Mass: Harvard University Press, 2004.
 Mario De Caro and David Macarthur (eds) Naturalism and Normativity. New York: Columbia University Press, 2010.
 Friedrich Albert Lange, The History of Materialism, London: Kegan Paul, Trench, Trubner & Co Ltd, 1925, 
 David Macarthur, "Quinean Naturalism in Question," Philo. vol 11, no. 1 (2008).
 Sander Verhaeg, Working from Within: The Nature and Development of Quine's Naturalism. New York: Oxford University Press, 2018.

External links

 

Irreligion
 
Epistemological theories
Epistemology of religion
Metaphysical theories
Metatheory of science
Materialism
Metaphilosophy